"American Boy" is a 2008 song by Estelle.

American Boy may also refer to:

Books
 The American Boy (magazine), a boy's magazine published 1899–1941 
American Boy, novel by Larry Watson
The American Boy, novel by Andrew Taylor CWA Historical Dagger Award 2003

Film and TV
 American Boy: A Profile of Steven Prince, a 1978 documentary film by Martin Scorsese

Music
 "American Boy" (Kombinaciya song), a 1990 Russian pop song by Kombinaciya
"American Boy" (Eddie Rabbitt song), a country song by Eddie Rabbitt
"American Boy", song by Chris Isaak from Always Got Tonight 2002

See also 
American Dad!